Robert Orville Swados (February 27, 1919 – November 23, 2012) was an attorney and businessman from Buffalo, New York, best known for his involvement as an attorney for the US/Canadian National Hockey League and being one of the founders of the Buffalo Sabres.

Career
Along with Seymour H. Knox III and Northrup R. Knox, he was a partner in Niagara Frontier Hockey, the original consortium that founded the Buffalo Sabres. The consortium (later joined by George Strawbridge) sold the team in 1996. Swados was an alumnus of the State University of New York at Buffalo and Harvard Law School. He served in the United States Army during World War II, fighting on the front lines in the European theatre during that war.

Swados was part of a group that attempted to form the Continental League, a baseball major league, in 1960, but failed before it started.

In addition to his duties as the Sabres' vice chairman, he also served as the secretary to the NHL's Board of Governors and as the general counsel to the league.

Outside of hockey, he was a partner in the Cohen Swados law firm, which specialized in corporate, tax and sports law before its disbanding in 2001.

Swados was the Chairman of the Hall of Fame for the Sabres.

Swados' autobiography, Counsel in the Crease, was published in 2005.

Personal life
Swados was married to poet and actress Sylvia Maisel, with whom he fathered two children, Lincoln and Elizabeth. Elizabeth Swados is known for her contributions to musical theatre.

References

1919 births
2012 deaths
Jewish American military personnel
United States Army personnel of World War II
Buffalo Sabres owners
Continental League contributors
Harvard Law School alumni
Lawyers from Buffalo, New York
University at Buffalo alumni
Businesspeople from Buffalo, New York
20th-century American businesspeople
20th-century American lawyers
21st-century American Jews